Examination of the Council of Trent (Latin: Examen Concilii Tridentini, 1565–73) is a large theological work of Lutheran Reformer Martin Chemnitz.

The work was published in Latin as four volumes. It includes the decrees and canons of the  Council of Trent analysed from a Lutheran point of view.

Examination of the Council of Trent has been translated into English by Fred Kramer and published by Concordia Publishing House, 1971–86.

Diogo de Payva de Andrada, a delegate at the Council of Trent, replied to Chemnitz's Examen with what is regarded as his best work: A Defence of the Faith of Trent, published in 1578. The doctrinal dispute between Andrada and Chemnitz had gone back and forth since Chemnitz had first published Theologiae Jesuitarum praecipua capita, in 1562.

References

1560s books
1570s books
Lutheran texts
16th-century Christian texts
16th-century Latin books
16th-century Lutheranism
1565 in Christianity